Elections to South Cambridgeshire District Council were held on Thursday 5 May 2022 as part of the 2022 United Kingdom local elections. All forty five seats were up for election in twenty six wards. The Liberal Democrats were defending the council, having won control in 2018.

Summary

Notes

Results by ward
A * denotes an incumbent

Balsham

Bar Hill

Barrington

Bassingbourn

Caldecote

Cambourne

Caxton & Papworth

Cottenham

Duxford

Fulbourn & Fen Ditton

Foxton

Deborah Roberts had previously been elected as an Independent.

Gamlingay

Girton

The Liberal Democrats had gained the Independent seat in a by-election.

Hardwick

Harston & Comberton

Histon & Impington

Linton

Longstanton

Melbourn

Milton & Waterbeach

Over & Willingham

Sawston

Shelford

Swavesey

The Mordens

Whittlesford

By-elections

Longstanton

Cottenham

References

South Cambridgeshire
2020s in Cambridgeshire
South Cambridgeshire District Council elections